Rani Arbo and the band Daisy Mayhem, consisting of Andrew Kinsey, Anand Nayak, and Scott Kessel, are an American musical group whose style combines folk, country blues, progressive bluegrass, jazz, and swing. Arbo and Kinsey were formerly members of Salamander Crossing.

Discography
 Cocktail Swing (2001)
 Gambling Eden (2003)
 Big Old Life (2007)
 Ranky Tanky (2010)
 Some Bright Morning (2012)
 Violets Are Blue (2015)
 Wintersong (2016)

External links
Official Website

American folk musical groups
Signature Sounds artists